The Michel Brière Memorial Trophy is awarded annually to the Most Valuable Player in the Quebec Major Junior Hockey League. It is named for former QMJHL and NHL player Michel Brière, who was killed in a car crash.

There is another trophy with the same name in honor of the same player awarded by the Pittsburgh Penguins organization to their Rookie of the Year, titled the Michel Brière Rookie of the Year Award.

Winners
Players listed in bold also won the CHL Player of the Year.

References

External links
 QMJHL official site List of trophy winners.

Quebec Major Junior Hockey League trophies and awards